Frederick is a masculine given name meaning "peaceful ruler". It is the English form of the German name Friedrich. Its meaning is derived from the Germanic word elements frid, or peace, and ric, meaning "ruler" or "power".

Frederick ranked among the top 100 names in the United States between 1880 and 1957 and has declined thereafter. It was ranked as the 536th most popular name for boys in 2009 in the United States. It ranked as the 99th most popular name for boys in England and Wales in 2007. Freddy, a short form, ranked as the 60th most popular name for boys in England and Wales in 2008. Short form Fred was among the most popular names for boys in Lower Saxony, Germany in 2010.

Frederica is a feminine variant of the name Frederick.

Variants
Afrikaans: Frederik
Breton: Frederig
Catalan: Frederic
Croatian: Fridrik
Czech: Bedřich, Bedříšek, Béda
Danish: Frederik, Frede 
Dutch: Frederick, Frederik, Fred, Frits, Freek, Rik, Fedde
Emiliano-Romagnolo: Fedrîgh
English: Frederick, Fredrick, Fred, Freddy, Freddie, Frederic, Fredric
Estonian: Priidu, Priit, Priidik, Preedik, Reedik
Faroese: Fríðrikur
Finnish: Fredrik, Veeti, Rieti, Sparksy
French: Frédéric (Frédérique is the feminine variant)
German: Friedrich, Fritz, Fredi, Fredy, Feick 
Greek: Φρειδερίκος (Freideríkos)
Hungarian: Frigyes, Frici
Icelandic: Friðrik
Irish: Feardorcha 
Italian: Federico, Fredo, Federigo (obsolete)
Latin: Fridericus 
Latvian: Frīdrihs, Fricis, Frīdis, Freds, Fredijs, Frederiks
Lithuanian: Frederikas
Norwegian: Fredrik
Old Frisian: Frethirik
Old Norse: Friðríkr 
Polish: Fryderyk, Fredek, Fryc
Portuguese: Fradique, Frederico
Russian: Фридрих (Fridrih), Фредерик (Frederik)
Scottish Gaelic: Freadaraig
Serbian: Fridrih
Slovene: Friderik
Spanish: Federico, Fico, Feche, Fede, Fadrique  (obsolete)
Swedish: Fredrik
Welsh: Ffredrig, Ffred

People with the name
Kings of Denmark

 Frederick I of Denmark
 Frederick II of Denmark
 Frederick III of Denmark
 Frederick IV of Denmark
 Frederick V of Denmark
 Frederick VI of Denmark
 Frederick VII of Denmark
 Frederick VIII of Denmark
 Frederick IX of Denmark

King of Sweden

 Frederick I of Sweden
 Adolf Frederick, King of Sweden (1710–1771)

Kings of Prussia

 Frederick I of Prussia, previously Frederick III, Elector of Brandenburg
 Frederick II of Prussia, Frederick the Great
 Frederick III, German Emperor, also King Frederick III of Prussia
 Frederick William I of Prussia (1688–1740)
 Frederick William II of Prussia (1744–1797)
 Frederick William III of Prussia (1770–1840)
 Frederick William IV of Prussia (1795–1861)

King of Württemberg

 Frederick I of Württemberg (1754–1816)

King of Bohemia
 Frederick V of the Palatinate

Holy Roman Emperors

 Frederick I, Holy Roman Emperor (Barbarossa)
 Frederick II, Holy Roman Emperor (1194–1250)
 Frederick III, Holy Roman Emperor (1415–1493)

Other royalty

 Frederick Henry, Prince of Orange (1584–1647), Stadtholder of Holland, one of the principal commanders of Dutch Revolt
 Frederick, Hereditary Prince of Anhalt-Dessau (1769–1814)
 Frederick, Hereditary Prince of Denmark (1753–1805)
 Frederick, Prince of Wales (1707–1751)
 Frederik, Crown Prince of Denmark (born 1968)
 Prince Frederick, Duke of York and Albany (1763–1827)
 Prince Frederick of Great Britain (1750–1765)
 Prince Friedrich of Hesse and by Rhine (1870–1873)
 Prince Frederick of Hesse-Kassel (1720–1785)
 Prince Frederick of Hesse-Kassel (1747–1837)
 Prince Frederick of Hohenzollern (1891–1965)
 Prince Frederick of Hohenzollern-Sigmaringen (1843–1904)
 Prince Frederick of Homburg (1585–1638)
 Frederick I, Margrave of Brandenburg-Ansbach
 Prince Frederick of Orange-Nassau (1774–1799)
 Prince Frederick of Prussia (1794–1863)
 Prince Friedrich of Saxe-Meiningen (1861–1914)
 Prince Frederick of Schaumburg-Lippe (1868–1945)
 Frederick Augustus, Prince of Anhalt-Zerbst
 Frederick Louis, Prince of Hohenlohe-Ingelfingen
 Prince Frederick of Schleswig-Holstein-Sonderburg-Augustenburg (1800–1865)
 Prince Frederick of the Netherlands (1797–1881)
 Prince Frederick of Württemberg (1808–1870)
 Prince Frederick Adolf, Duke of Östergötland (1750–1803)
 Prince Frederick Augustus of Anhalt-Dessau (1799–1864)
 Prince Frederick Charles of Hesse (1868–1940)
 Prince Frederick Charles of Prussia (1801–1883)
 Frederick II Eugene, Duke of Württemberg
 Prince Frederick Ferdinand Constantin of Saxe-Weimar-Eisenach
 Prince Friedrich Franz Xaver of Hohenzollern-Hechingen (1757–1844)
 Prince Friedrich Karl of Prussia (1828–1885)
 Prince Friedrich Karl of Prussia (1893–1917)
 Prince Friedrich Leopold of Prussia (1865–1931)
 Prince Friedrich Sigismund of Prussia (1891–1927)
 Prince Friedrich Wilhelm of Hohenzollern (1924–2010)
 Prince Friedrich Wilhelm of Lippe (born 1947)
 Prince Friedrich Wilhelm of Prussia (1880–1925)
 Prince Frederick William of Hesse-Kassel (1820–1884)
 Prince Frederick William of Schleswig-Holstein-Sonderburg-Augustenburg (1668–1714)
 Prince Frederick William of Solms-Braunfels (1770–1814)
Adolphus Frederick II, Duke of Mecklenburg-Strelitz (1658–1708)
Adolphus Frederick VI, Grand Duke of Mecklenburg-Strelitz (1882–1918)
Frederick William, Duke of Schleswig-Holstein-Sonderburg-Glücksburg
Frederick I, Duke of Anhalt
Frederick VIII, Duke of Schleswig-Holstein
Frederick III, Duke of Holstein-Gottorp
Frederick IV, Duke of Holstein-Gottorp
Charles Frederick, Duke of Holstein-Gottorp
John Frederick I, Elector of Saxony
George Frederick, Margrave of Brandenburg-Ansbach
Albert Frederick, Duke of Prussia
Joachim Frederick, Elector of Brandenburg

People
Fred Akuffo (1937–1979), Ghanaian army officer, Head of State of Ghana from July 1978-June 1979
Frederick Benteen, American military officer 
Frederick Cronyn Betts, Canadian politician and solicitor
Freddie Blassie, American professional wrestling villain and manager
Frederick C. Bock, World War II pilot
Fred Bodsworth, Canadian writer, journalist and amateur naturalist
Frederick Russell Burnham, American scout and world-traveling adventurer known for his service to the British South Africa Company and to the British Army in colonial Africa, helped inspire the founding of the international Scouting Movement
Frederick Bywaters (1902–1923), English murderer 
Frederick Carrington, British military leader
Frédéric Chopin, Polish composer, one of the greatest composers of the Romantic Era
Fredrick de Silva, Sri Lankan Ambassador to France and UNESCO
Federico Fellini, Italian filmmaker
William Frederick Fisher, American physician and former NASA astronaut
Frederick Graff (1775–1847), American hydraulic engineer
Frederick D. Gregory, former United States Air Force pilot, military engineer, test pilot, and NASA astronaut as well as former NASA Deputy Administrator
Frederick Gutekunst (1831–1917), American photographer
Frederick Halterman (1831–1907), U.S. Congressman
Frederick Hauck, retired captain in the United States Navy, former fighter pilot and NASA astronaut
Frederick Mitchell Hodgson, British colonial administrator who was Governor of the Gold Coast (1898–1900), Barbados (1900–04) and British Guiana (1904–11)
Frederick Howard, 5th Earl of Carlisle, British peer, statesman, diplomat, and author
Frederic Lang, New Zealand politician, initially an independent conservative, then from 1914 a member of the Reform Party, the eighth Speaker of the House of Representatives, from 1913 to 1922
Frederick W. Leslie, American scientist who flew on the NASA STS-73 Space Shuttle mission as a payload specialist
Federico da Montefeltro, one of the most successful mercenary captains of the Italian Renaissance, and lord of Urbino
Frederick North, Lord North, Prime Minister of Great Britain from 1770 to 1782 who led Great Britain through most of the American War of Independence
Frederick Law Olmsted, American landscape architect, journalist, social critic, and public administrator, popularly considered to be the father of American landscape architecture
 Frederick C. Olney (1862–1918), African-American lawyer with Native American ancestry
Frederick Alfred Pile, British army officer 
Frederick Poole, English army officer and general
Frederick Roberts, British Army officer
Frederick Robinson, 1st Viscount Goderich, British politician during the Regency, Prime Minister of the United Kingdom between August 1827 and January 1828
Frederick Sandys, British painter, illustrator, and draughtsman
Fred G. Sanford (fictional), elderly, widowed, sarcastic, and cantankerous junk dealer
Frederick Sanger, British Biochemist that twice won the Nobel Prize in Chemistry, one for his work on the structure of Insulin and another for his contribution to the possibilities of DNA sequencing
Fredrick de Saram (1912–1983), Sri Lankan Sinhala army colonel, lawyer, and cricket captain
Frederick Scherger, British Air Chief Marshal
Federico Spinola, Italian naval commander in Spanish Habsburg service, one of the principal commanders of Battle of Sesimbra Bay, Battle of the Narrow Seas and Battle of Sluys
Frederick W. Sturckow, engineer, retired United States Marine Corps officer, former NASA astronaut, and commercial spacecraft pilot
Frederic Thesiger, 1st Baron Chelmsford, British jurist and Conservative politician, twice Lord Chancellor of Great Britain
Frederic Thesiger, 1st Viscount Chelmsford, British statesman who served as Governor of Queensland from 1905 to 1909, Governor of New South Wales from 1909 to 1913, and Viceroy of India from 1916 to 1921, where he was responsible for the creation of the Montagu–Chelmsford Reforms
Frederic Thesiger, 2nd Baron Chelmsford, British imperial general who came to prominence during the Anglo-Zulu War

Notes

See also 
 Frederica (given name)
 Georgii Frederiks
 Fredro
 Fredericks (surname)

Masculine given names
English masculine given names